Erwin Helmchen (10 May 1907 – 8 June 1981) was a German footballer who played as a striker. He is the most prolific goalscorer in official matches in recorded history according to RSSSF with at least 987 goals scored in 577 official matches, as well as the second goalscorer in league matches with over 720 goals, the second-most prolific goalscorer for a single team in official matches with at least 667 goals and the goalscorer with most career hat-tricks with at least 141.

Club career

FV Brandenburg Cottbus 
Helmchen started his career at  FV Brandenburg Cottbus in 1923, at the age of 16. In Lower Lusatia, he took part with the FV Brandenburg in the finals of the South Eastern German football championship. However, the Breslau clubs, Sportfreunde Breslau and Breslauer SC 08 dominated the competition. He scored 151 goals in 86 official games.

PSV Chemnitz 
In 1928, Helmchen joined PSV Chemnitz. He scored in his first five seasons at PSV 213 goals in the regional championship rounds, However, they found fierce rivalry with the local competitors Chemnitzer BC. In 1932, PSV managed to reach the Central German football championship final against Dresdner SC to win 3–2 after extra-time. Helmchen scored 51 goals in the championship for PSV, with a total of 120 goals in the 1931–32 season. PSV later participated in the 1932 German football championship, where they lost 2–3 to the eventual German champions Bayern Munich in the quarter-finals. However, Helmchen managed to score 5 goals in that competition to finish in second place behind Karl Ehmer.

The Gauliga Sachsen was inaugurated in 1933. Helmchen with his club in the debut season 1933–34 finished third behind Dresdner SC and VfB Leipzig. In 1934–35 and 1935–36 seasons, PSV Chemnitz managed to win two titles in the Gauliga Sachsen, both in front of the Dresdner SC. In the 1935 German football championship, PSV lost in the semi-finals 2–3 against the eventual winners FC Schalke 04, both PSV goals were scored by Helmchen. In total Helmchen scored 678 goals in 372 official matches for PSV Chemnitz.

In the 1935–36 Reichsbundpokal (de), PSV won against Gauliga Südwest/Mainhessen team in the final, with Helmchen scoring nine goals in total. In the 1936 German football championship group stage, PSV defeated Schalke 3–2 in front of 40,000 spectators in Dortmund's Stadion Rote Erde, and Helmchen contributed two goals to the win. However, Schalke managed to win 2–1 against PSV at Ostragehege to advance to the next round on goal difference. With a total of ten goals, Helmchen once again underlined his above-average qualifications in the final round.

PSV was runner-up with his team in the 1936–37 season, then third in 1938 and 1941, but it was no longer enough to make another entry into the final round of the German championship. However, PSV lost two Reichsbundpokal finals in 1936–37 against Gauliga Niederrhein and 1939–40 Gauliga Bayern teams, as Helmchen was a captain in the latter final.

Regional leagues 
After the Second World War, Helmchen joined SG Chemnitz Nord in 1945, where Helmchen played for in Chemnitz regional competitions. The team finished first in 1947 and third in 1948. In the 1948–49 season, his team lost the finals against Meeraner SV. He was called up on 23 January 1949 in the selection game between Saxony and Berlin by Saxony coach Helmut Schön as a centre forward. He scored the last goals in the autumn round of 1949–50 in the state class of Saxony for SG Chemnitz Nord, which by then had changed it name once more to BSG Fewa Chemnitz.

Helmchen later moved to Schleswig-Holstein. First, he was at Eintracht Rendsburg and from February 1950 at VfB Lübeck, where he was a player-coach in the football league north. In the following season 1950–51, Helmchen won the championship with VfB in the Schleswig-Holstein-Liga, but failed in the promotion round to the upper league. In 1951–52, he won the state league championship again with VfB, but the return to the Oberliga Nord was not successful at the second attempt. He trained with the national league team SV Friedrichsort until 1956.

International career 
He was called up on 24 May 1931, in the German defeat 0–6 against Austria. In 1937, there were two more appearances in test matches before international matches: on 22 May in Stuttgart against Manchester City and on 24 October in Berlin against Gau Brandenburg. However, he did not feature in any of the national team matches, due to several reasons including injury, bad form, leaving a bad impression and, on one occasion, having to attend a wedding.

Death and legacy 
Helmchen lived with his wife Erna in Kiel, Elmschenhagen until his death on 8 June 1981, where he is also buried. The wish he expressed to want to rest under the ground of the Chemnitz "Stadium on Gellertstrasse" was symbolically fulfilled on 8 September 2001. On this day, Holstein Kiel and Chemnitzer FC met in the Regionalliga Nord for their first league game. The CFC fan club "Clubsurfer" then called out the "Lawn for Erwin" campaign, in which a piece of turf from the Chemnitz soccer turf was cut off and placed on Helmchen's grave in Kiel with a small devotion.

Career statistics

Honours 
PSV Chemnitz

 Central German football championship: 1932
 Gauliga Sachsen: 1935, 1936
 Saxon Cup: 1935
VfB Lübeck

 Schleswig-Holstein-Liga: 1951, 1952

See also 
 List of men's footballers with 500 or more goals

References

External links 
 Erwin Helmchen at dfb.de.

Literature 
 Gerhard Claus: 100 years of football in Chemnitz. Pictures, stories, tables . Chemnitzer Verlag, Chemnitz 1999, .
 Gau selection competitions 1933–1942. In: Libero IFFHS, No. D 17, 1998, III. Quarter.
 Lorenz Knieriem: goalscorer. A typology of the executor. AGON Sportverlag, Kassel 2005, .
 Hardy Grüne, Lorenz Knieriem: Encyclopedia of German League Football. Volume 8: Player Lexicon 1890–1963. AGON Sportverlag, Kassel 2006, .

1907 births
1981 deaths
Sportspeople from Cottbus
People from the Province of Brandenburg
German footballers
Association football forwards
Chemnitzer FC players
VfB Lübeck players
Footballers from Brandenburg